Lipót Fejér (or Leopold Fejér, ; 9 February 1880 – 15 October 1959) was a Hungarian mathematician of Jewish heritage. Fejér was born Leopold Weisz, and changed to the Hungarian name Fejér around 1900.

Biography
Fejér studied mathematics and physics at the University of Budapest and at the University of Berlin, where he was taught by Hermann Schwarz.  In 1902 he earned his doctorate from University of Budapest (today Eötvös Loránd University). From 1902 to 1905 Fejér taught there and from 1905 until 1911 he taught at Franz Joseph University in Kolozsvár in Austria-Hungary (now Cluj-Napoca in Romania). In 1911 Fejér was appointed to the chair of mathematics at the University of Budapest and he held that post until his death. He was elected corresponding member (1908), member (1930) of the Hungarian Academy of Sciences.

During his period in the chair at Budapest Fejér led a highly successful Hungarian school of analysis. He was the thesis advisor of mathematicians such as John von Neumann, Paul Erdős, George Pólya and Pál Turán.

Lipót Fejér is buried in Kerepesi Cemetery in Budapest.

Fejér's research concentrated on harmonic analysis and, in particular, Fourier series.

Fejér collaborated to produce important papers, one with Carathéodory on entire functions in 1907 and another major work with Frigyes Riesz in 1922 on conformal mappings (specifically, a short proof of the Riemann mapping theorem).

Pólya on Fejér 

Pólya writes the following about Fejér, telling us much about his personality:

He had artistic tastes. He deeply loved music and was a good pianist. He liked a well-turned phrase. 'As to earning a living', he said, 'a professor's salary is a necessary, but not sufficient, condition.' Once he was very angry with a colleague who happened to be a topologist, and explaining the case at length he wound up by declaring '... and what he is saying is a topological mapping of the truth'.

He had a quick eye for foibles and miseries; in seemingly dull situations he noticed points that were unexpectedly funny or unexpectedly pathetic. He carefully cultivated his talent of raconteur; when he told, with his characteristic gestures, of the little shortcomings of a certain great mathematician, he was irresistible. The hours spent in continental coffee houses with Fejér discussing mathematics and telling stories are a cherished recollection for many of us. Fejér presented his mathematical remarks with the same verve as his stories, and this may have helped him in winning the lasting interest of so many younger men in his problems.

In the same article Pólya writes about Fejér's style of mathematics:

Fejér talked about a paper he was about to write up. 'When I write a paper,' he said, 'I have to rederive for myself the rules of differentiation and sometimes even the commutative law of multiplication.' These words stuck in my memory and years later I came to think that they expressed an essential aspect of Fejér's mathematical talent; his love for the intuitively clear detail.

It was not given to him to solve very difficult problems or to build vast conceptual structures. Yet he could perceive the significance, the beauty, and the promise of a rather concrete not too large problem, foresee the possibility of a solution and work at it with intensity. And, when he had found the solution, he kept on working at it with loving care, till each detail became fully transparent.

It is due to such care spent on the elaboration of the solution that Fejér's papers are very clearly written, and easy to read and most of his proofs appear very clear and simple. Yet only the very naive may think that it is easy to write a paper that is easy to read, or that it is a simple thing to point out a significant problem that is capable of a simple solution.

See also 
Fejér kernel
Fejér's theorem

References

External links 

 
 Birthplace of Lipót Fejér.

Further reading

1880 births
1959 deaths
People from Pécs
Hungarian Jews
Approximation theorists
20th-century Hungarian mathematicians
Members of the Hungarian Academy of Sciences
Mathematical analysts
Academic staff of Franz Joseph University
Burials at Kerepesi Cemetery
Austro-Hungarian mathematicians